La Carapate is a 1978 French comedy film directed by Gérard Oury.

Plot 
In May 1968, Jean-Philippe Duroc, a lawyer accused of ultra-leftism, visits his client, Martial Gaulard, sentenced to death for a murder he has not committed. At that moment, a mutiny happens inside the prison. Gaulard takes the opportunity and, stealing the clothes of his lawyer, achieves to escape. The police is convinced that Duroc has contributed at the evasion and the two men are wanted by all the police stations of France.

Cast 
 Pierre Richard ... Maître Jean-Philippe Duroc, lawyer of Martial Gaulard
 Victor Lanoux ... Martial Gaulard, the accused, fascist and anti-soixante-huitard
 Raymond Bussières ... Marcel Duroc, vieux père de Jean-Philippe
 Jean-Pierre Darras ... Jacques Panivaux, the Bourgeois 
 Yvonne Gaudeau ... Gisèle Panivaux, the Bourgeoise
 Jacques Frantz ... Rocheteau
 Claire Richard ... Blanche Hirondelle "Bach Yen", the Vietnamese fiancée of Gaulard
 Blanche Ravalec ... Marguerite
 Claude Brosset ... Gustave
 Bernard Granger ... Jeannot
 Éric Desmaretz ... the judge
 Katia Tchenko ... the prostitute
 Bruno Balp ... Gaston Buteau
 Janine Souchon ... Josette Buteau
 Christian Bouillette ... Dupuis
 Alain Doutey ... the inspector
 Robert Dalban ... the bar owner
 Henri Poirier ... brigadier CRS

Release 
The film was released 10 years after the May 1968 events in France.

Bibliography 
  (reprinted by Presses Pocket in 1989, and by Plon in 1999)

References

External links 
 

1978 comedy films
1978 films
French comedy road movies
1970s comedy road movies
Films set in Paris
Films set in Lyon
Films directed by Gérard Oury
1970s French-language films
1970s French films